Canyons School District is a school district in the southeastern portion of Salt Lake County in Utah, United States. The district includes the cities of Cottonwood Heights, the Salt Lake County section of Draper, Midvale and Sandy and the townships of Alta, Brighton and White City. Residents of those communities voted to create the district in 2007, making Canyons the first school district to be formed in the state in almost a century. Canyons has approximately 34,000 students in 50 schools.  There are 29 elementary schools, eight middle schools, five traditional high schools, and eight special programs schools, including one technical school, a special education school and a high school for adults in prison. The district covers 192 square miles and employs 6,000 people.

The district officially started operating on July 1, 2009, with students attending Canyons schools for the first time that fall.

History 
Canyons District was created after residents voted in 2007 to leave the Jordan School District, which was the largest district in Utah at the time. David Doty, a former high school Spanish teacher and assistant commissioner and director of policy studies for the Utah System of Higher Education, was chosen by the new board of education to be the district's first superintendent.

In June 2013, Doty resigned his position to join an education consulting firm. Deputy superintendent Ginger Rhode was appointed as interim superintendent. After a national search, James Briscoe became superintendent on July 1, 2014. In July 2020, Rick Robins was appointed as CSD's new superintendent, replacing Briscoe, who retired. Robins came to Canyons from Juab School District, where he was superintendent for six years.

Boundary
Canyons includes Alta, Brighton, Cottonwood Heights, Midvale, Sandy, White City, and the portion of Draper in Salt Lake County.

Board of Education 
The Canyons Board of Education is composed of seven members. The incumbent members of the board are:

 Mont L. Millerberg (District 1)
 Amber Shill (District 2)
 Nancy Tingey (District 3)
 Clareen Arnold (District 4)
 Steve Wrigley (District 5)
 Amanda Oaks (District 6)
 Holly Neibaur (District 7)

State championships 
Canyons high schools have won 36 state championships in sports that are officially sanctioned by the Utah High School Activities Association. Those state championships include:

2009–2010
 Alta boys basketball (5A)
 Alta girls soccer (5A)
 Brighton girls swimming (5A)
 Brighton boys swimming (5A)
 Brighton boys tennis (5A)

2010–2011
 Alta girls basketball (5A)
 Alta boys soccer (5A)
 Brighton girls soccer (5A)
 Brighton boys swimming (5A)
 Brighton girls soccer (5A)
 Brighton boys tennis (5A)

2011–2012
 Alta boys golf (5A)
 Alta girls soccer (5A)
 Alta girls tennis (5A)
 Brighton girls swimming (5A)
 Brighton boys swimming (5A)
 Brighton boys tennis (5A)

2012–2013
 Brighton boys golf (5A)
 Brighton girls swimming (5A)
 Brighton boys swimming (5A)
 Jordan football (5A)

2013–2014
 Brighton boys swimming (5A)

2014–2015
 Alta boys soccer (5A)
 Brighton girls basketball (5A)

2015–2016
 Corner Canyon girls golf (4A)

2016–2017
 Corner Canyon girls golf (4A)

2017–2018
 Brighton boys tennis (5A)
 Corner Canyon girls golf (5A)
 Corner Canyon girls track and field (5A)

2018–2019
 Corner Canyon football (5A)

2019–2020
 Corner Canyon boys cross country (6A)
 Corner Canyon football (6A)

2020–2021
 Alta boys lacrosse (Division B)
 Corner Canyon football (6A)
 Corner Canyon boys lacrosse (Division A)
 Corner Canyon boys track and field (6A)

Assets, bonds and debt 
Canyons School District and Jordan School District entered an arbitration process to divide assets between the two districts after Canyons' creation. As a result of that process, Canyons School District received 41 percent of the overall assets, based on student population. Canyons also agreed to pay 58 percent of a $281 million bond debt — incurred in 2003 by the formerly combined district — until 2022. Voters approved tax-rate-neutral bonds of $250 million in 2010 and $283 million in 2017 for repairs, rebuilds and upgrades to facilities throughout the district.

Schools

High schools 

 Alta High School (Sandy)
 Brighton High School (Cottonwood Heights)
 Corner Canyon High School (Draper)
 Hillcrest High School (Midvale)
 Jordan High School  (Sandy)

Middle schools 

 Albion Middle School (Sandy)
 Butler Middle School (Cottonwood Heights)
 Draper Park Middle School (Draper)
 Eastmont Middle School (Sandy)
 Indian Hills Middle School (Sandy)
 Midvale Middle School (Midvale)
 Mount Jordan Middle School (Sandy)
 Union Middle School (Sandy)

Elementary schools 

 Alta View Elementary School (White City)
 Altara Elementary School (Sandy)
 Bell View Elementary School (Sandy)
 Bella Vista Elementary School (Cottonwood Heights)
 Brookwood Elementary School (Sandy)
 Butler Elementary School (Cottonwood Heights)
 Canyon View Elementary School (Cottonwood Heights)
 Copperview Elementary School (Midvale)
 Crescent Elementary School (Sandy)
 Draper Elementary School (Draper)
 East Midvale Elementary School (Midvale)
 East Sandy Elementary School (Sandy)
 Edgemont Elementary School (Sandy)
 Granite Elementary School (Sandy)
 Lone Peak Elementary School (Sandy)
 Midvale Elementary School (Midvale)
 Midvalley Elementary School (Midvale)
 Oak Hollow Elementary School (Draper)
 Oakdale Elementary School (Sandy)
 Park Lane Elementary School (Sandy)
 Peruvian Park Elementary School (Sandy)
 Quail Hollow Elementary School (Sandy)
 Ridgecrest Elementary School (Cottonwood Heights)
 Sandy Elementary School (Sandy)
 Silver Mesa Elementary School (Sandy)
 Sprucewood Elementary School (Sandy)
 Sunrise Elementary School (Sandy)
 Willow Canyon Elementary School (Sandy)
 Willow Springs Elementary School (Draper)
 Goldminer's Daughter Lodge (satellite school in Alta Township)

Specialty schools 

 Canyons Online
 Canyons Technical Education Center
 Canyons Transition Academy
 Canyons Virtual High School
 Entrada Adult High School
 Jordan Valley School
 South Park Academy

References

External links
 

Education in Salt Lake County, Utah
School districts in Utah